Wynn Edwards (November 9, 1842 – August 7, 1900) was an American farmer and politician.

Born near Ruthin, Wales, Edwards emigrated to the United States and settled in the town of Rosendale, Wisconsin, where he farmed. He took a business course at Byrant & Stratton College in Chicago, Illinois. Edwards served in the 21st Wisconsin Volunteer Infantry Regiment during the American Civil War. Edwards served as chairman and treasurer of the town of Rosendale, Wisconsin. He also served as postmaster of Rosendale. Edwards served in the Wisconsin State Assembly in 1897 and was a Republican. Edwards died of a heart ailment in a hotel in Oshkosh, Wisconsin while there to consult a physician.

Notes

1842 births
1900 deaths
Welsh emigrants to the United States
People from Ruthin
People from Rosendale, Wisconsin
People of Wisconsin in the American Civil War
Farmers from Wisconsin
Mayors of places in Wisconsin
Wisconsin postmasters
Republican Party members of the Wisconsin State Assembly
19th-century American politicians
American treasurers